La Reine Margot (French: Queen Margot) is a 1954 French-Italian adventure historical drama film directed by Jean Dréville, scripted by Abel Gance from the 1845 novel La Reine Margot by Alexandre Dumas. It stars Jeanne Moreau, Armando Francioli and Françoise Rosay. The film is also known under the alternative title A Woman of Evil.

It was made as a co-production between the French and Italian branches of Lux Film. It was made at the Epinay Studios in Paris. The film's sets were designed by the art director Maurice Colasson. It was shot in Eastmancolor.

Cast 
 Jeanne Moreau as Margaret of Valois
 Armando Francioli as Joseph Boniface de La Môle
 Henri Génès as Hannibal de Coconas
 Robert Porte as Charles IX
 André Versini as Henri de Navarre
 Françoise Rosay as Catherine de' Medici
 Vittorio Sanipoli as Maurevel
 Fiorella Mari as Henriette de Nevers
 Patrizia Lari as Charlotte de Sauve
 Daniel Ceccaldi as Henri d'Anjou
 Louis de Funès (uncredited) as René Bianchi
 Jacques Eyser as Caboche
 Guy Kerner as duc Henri de Guise
 Louis Arbessier as Admiral Gaspard de Coligny
 Nicole Riche as Gilonne
 Jean Temerson as aubergiste de La Belle Étoile
 Robert Moor as procureur
 Olivier Mathot as Pierre

See also 
 La Reine Margot (1994 film)

References

Bibliography
 Klossner, Michael. The Europe of 1500-1815 on Film and Television: A Worldwide Filmography of Over 2550 Works, 1895 Through 2000. McFarland & Company, 2002.

External links 
 
 La Reine Margot at the Films de France

1954 films
French adventure films
Italian adventure films
Italian historical drama films
French historical drama films
1950s historical drama films
Films set in the 16th century
1950s French-language films
Films based on works by Alexandre Dumas
Films directed by Jean Dréville
Films set in France
Cultural depictions of Catherine de' Medici
Cultural depictions of Henry I, Duke of Guise
Cultural depictions of Henry III of France
Lux Film films
Films shot at Epinay Studios
1950s French films
1950s Italian films